Dr. V. Rajeshwaran M.B.B.S (1 October, 1950 – 6 June, 2021) was an Indian politician and former Member of Parliament elected from Tamil Nadu. He was elected to the Lok Sabha from Ramanathapuram constituency as an Indian National Congress candidate in 1984, 1989 and 1991 elections.

References 

Indian National Congress politicians from Tamil Nadu
India MPs 1984–1989
India MPs 1989–1991
India MPs 1991–1996
Lok Sabha members from Tamil Nadu
People from Ramanathapuram district